Egedege Dance  is one of the most renowned traditional dance outfits and an Igbo traditional Royal-styled cultural dance in the whole of South Eastern Nigeria. Founded in 1985, it is a reincarnation of an old version originally performed by the ancestors of the present-day Unubi. In those days, it was a moonlight dance, performed by youths. It has however been remodeled to fit modern trends. Their performance is a combination of songs, dance, Instrumentation and colorful traditional outfits. Their performance is introduced by elaborate fluting which is the entrance cue that heralds the group, led by the queen. The singing only begins when the queen reaches the stage and takes the microphone. She arrives under a big umbrella, carried by one man, with another fanning her from behind. She sings but sometimes dance to the rhythm of the instrument. Egedege dance was made popular by Mrs Theresa Onuorah in Unubi Town. She is happily married and lives in Unubi. 
The name Egedege stems from a local slang for richness and bravery which explains why the dance is considered Cultural classics and are only played in a royal homes or rich families.

Form and structure
The leader of the Unubi Egedege dance group is their queen, Queen Theresa Onuorah. She is the chief vocalist and is sometimes supported by backup singers. There are also dancers who contribute to make Egedege very popular. The dance became popular with audiences via their hit singles, live performances, originality and showmanship in important occasions from the 1980s onwards and has been renowned by the royal-like representation display by the lead singer.

Symbol of Igbo culture
The dance which was popularized by Queen Theresa Onuorah as the leader of Egedege dance of Africa has helped in promoting the cultural mosaic of the Igbo cultural heritage. The tempo of the egedege dance matches the tempo of the music, which is dependent on the beat of the drum, "ogene," a metal gong instrument, Udu, ekwe and flutes and other local instruments. In recent times, more artists have variation of the dance with a common traits of heavy traditional royal costumes. It should also be noted that lyrics of the songs often time besides entertaining also address social issues.

Performance
Egedege Dance groups perform mainly at Igbo cultural festivals and high-profile event. Sometimes the dance groups are called to perform, during funerals, marriage ceremonies or other official government occasions.

Costume
The queen is dressed in an expensive and elaborately designed and decorated robe, held at the waist by ten strings of beads. Her crown is of bronze, overlaid with ostrich feathers. Many more beads adorn her neck. In her hands, she holds a horsetail and a bronze staff. The dancers and instrumentalists are dressed uniformly in raffia waist shrouds and arm bands, calf and ankle jingles, several bead necklaces, around their heads, they wear red ribbons. The major overall color impressions are red and white.

References

Igbo culture
Igbo society